The Japanese in Hawaii (simply Japanese or “Local Japanese”, rarely Kepanī) are the second largest ethnic group in Hawaii. At their height in 1920, they constituted 43% of Hawaii's population. They now number about 16.7% of the islands' population, according to the 2000 U.S. Census. The U.S. Census categorizes mixed-race individuals separately, so the proportion of people with some Japanese ancestry is likely much larger.

History

Contact before 1778

Final voyage of the Inawaka-maru
The first known arrival of Japanese to the Kingdom of Hawaii after Hawaiian contact with James Cook came on May 5, 1806, involving survivors of the ill-fated ship Inawaka-maru who had been adrift aboard their disabled ship for more than seventy days.

The Inawaka-maru, a small cargo ship built in 1798 in Osaka, was owned by Mansuke Motoya. The Inawaka-maru started its final voyage from Hiroshima to Edo (modern Tokyo) on November 7, 1805. The ship had been chartered by the Kikkawa clan to deliver mats, horse feed, and two passengers, Kikkawa officials. Her crew consisted of Captain Niinaya Ginzo, Master Ichiko Sadagoro, Sailors Hirahara Zenmatsu, Akazaki Matsujiro, Yumori Kasoji, and Wasazo, a total of eight aboard. The Inawaka-maru had to turn back, and restarted her journey on November 27. She arrived in Edo on December 21, started back to her home port stopping in Kanagawa, Uraga, and Shimoda, and left on her final leg – from Shimoda across the Enshū Sea – on January 6, 1806.

The Inawaka-maru was caught by a snowstorm that turned to rain and winds battered the ship eastward into the Pacific Ocean. On January 7 the crew cut down the mast because of the strong winds. On January 11 two rocky islands were sighted but no attempt was made toward them. These would be the last land before the Hawaiian Islands. On January 20 the water stores were empty, but the men collected rain water to survive. On February 28 the rice provisions ran out. On March 15 a flying fish landed in the ship and the men fished to sustain themselves. On March 20 the Tabour, an American ship Captained by Cornelius Sole, rescued the men of the Inawaka-maru. He found them begging for food by gesturing to their stomachs, mouths and bowing, found the galley empty, and understood their ordeal. He had the possessions of the survivors brought aboard his ship and salvaged parts and items aboard Inawaka-maru. Captain Sole had the survivors fed, over a span of five days, small portions to a progression to three normal meals a day, the remedy for starvation. On May 5, 1806, the Tabour docked in Oahu, Hawaii. Captain Sole left the eight Japanese in the care of King Kamehameha I. Captain Sole also left the anchor of the Inawaka-maru, 40 axes, and other items as payment for the Kingdom's hospitality.

The King delegated the responsibility for the Japanese to Kalanimoku who had 50 men construct a house on May 6 for the Japanese. It took four days to build and a cook and two guards assigned to the house, which attracted crowds to these men of a different ethnicity. On August 17 the Japanese left Hawaii aboard the Perseverance to Macau on October 17. From there they took a Chinese ship to Jakarta on December 25. In Jakarta they fell ill and five died there or on the voyage to Nagasaki where they arrived on June 17, 1807, where another died. At the time of the Sakoku it was illegal to leave Japan and the remaining two survivors were jailed and interrogated. One committed suicide and the remaining survivor Hirahara Zenmatsu eventually made it home November 29, 1807 but was summoned by Asano Narikata, The Daimyō of Hiroshima, to recount his odyssey of an experience titled Iban Hyoryu Kikokuroku Zenmatsu. Hirahara Zenmatsu died six months later.

Gannenmono
In 1866, Eugene Miller Van Reed, a Dutch American, went to Japan as a representative of the Hawaiian Kingdom. He failed to establish a formal Hawaii-Japan relationship, but continued to stay there as a merchant and obtained a permission of Japanese emigration from the Edo Shogunate. As he started recruiting, the new Meiji Government that came into power in 1867, the first year of the Meiji period, nullified all the Edo Shogunate's treaties. (One of the reasons of the new government's rejection is said to be the rumor that Van Reed was engaged in slave trade. For example, Korekiyo Takahashi, whose study in the U.S. was arranged by Van Reed, ended up being sold by the host family as a slave, but managed to get back to Japan, and eventually became the 20th Prime Minister.)  Van Reed, however, proceeded without the new government's permission to send 153 Japanese to Hawaii to work on the sugar plantations. They sailed from Yokohama to Honolulu from May 17 to June 19, 1868, on the Scioto. This first official group of Japanese immigrants were called the Gannenmono, meaning the "people of the first year (of the Meiji period)", and the 150th anniversary of their arrival was celebrated in Hawaii in 2018.

There were 142 men and 6 women in this initial group, so many of them married Hawaiians after they arrived in Hawaii. They worked on sugar plantations on Oahu, Maui, Kauai, and Lanai. Two or three months after arriving, many complained of contract violations since the working conditions and pay did not match with what they were promised. At least four of the six women and 50 men returned to Japan in 1870. Seven had died before their contracts ended. Among the Gannenmono were several people who would become legends among the Japanese Americans in Hawaii: Tomitarō Makino from Miyagi, the leader of the group; the youngest Ichigorō Ishimura, 13 years old; Sentarō Ishii, a samurai from Okayama, who was 102 years old when he died in Maui; Tokujirō "Toko" Satō from Tokyo, who lived in Waipio Valley with his Hawaiian wife, Clara; and Tarō Andō, who would become Japan's first consul general to the Kingdom of Hawaii.

Subsequent immigration
Between 1869 and 1885 Japan barred emigration to Hawaii in fear that Japanese laborers would be degrading to the reputation of the Japanese race. In 1881 King David Kalākaua visited Japan to strengthen relations between the two nations. Kalākaua offered not to request extraterritoriality of Japan, an act that departed from the norm of western nations. On March 10 Kalakaua met Meiji to propose a marriage between Princess Victoria Kaiulani and Prince Higashifushimi Yorihito. A few days later the proposal was denied, but the ban on immigration was eventually lifted in 1885. The first 153 Japanese immigrants arrived in Hawaii on February 8, 1885, as contract laborers for the sugarcane and pineapple plantations. Many more Japanese immigrants came to Hawaii in the following years. Most of these migrants came from southern Japan (Hiroshima, Yamaguchi, Kumamoto, etc.) due to crop failures in the region.

Okinawan immigration 

In 1900, the first group of Okinawan laborers arrived in Hawaii after Japan lifted its emigration ban on Okinawa Prefecture. These laborers were helped by Kyuzo Toyama, who is considered to be the "father of Okinawan emigration". Kyuzo Toyama himself led the second group of Okinawans, who arrived on 1903. By 1920, nearly 20,000 Okinawans and their descendants lived in Hawaii. Today, Okinawans in Hawaii form a distinct community from the Japanese in Hawaii due to cultural and linguistic differences.

Annexation of Hawaii by the United States

The political environment shifted with the onset of a new era known as the Hawaiian Revolutions. In 1887 the settlers ended absolute rule by the king by forcing him to accept the Bayonet Constitution and agreeing to constitutional government with a powerful parliament. The new constitution gave voting rights only for Hawaiians, Americans, and Europeans, and thus denied rights for Japanese and other Asians. The Japanese commissioner worked to pressure the Kingdom to restore the rights of Japanese by amending the constitution. In 1893 the Hawaiian Monarchy was overthrown, Tokyo responded by appointing Captain Tōgō Heihachirō to command the Japanese naval activities in Hawaii. The HIJMS Naniwa was sent immediately to Hawaii to rendezvous with the HIJMS Kongō which had been on a training mission.

Captain Tōgō had previously been a guest of Kalākaua, and returned to Hawaii to denounce the overthrow of Queen Lydia Liliʻuokalani, sister and successor to the late king and conduct “gunboat diplomacy”. Tōgō refused to salute the Provisional Government by not flying the flag of the Republic. He refused to recognize the new regime, encouraged the British ship  to do the same and protested the overthrow. The Japanese commissioner eventually stopped Tōgō from continuing his protest, believing it would undo his work at restoring rights to Japanese. Katō Kanji wrote in hindsight that he had regretted they had not protested harder and should have recruited the British in the protest.

The continued presence of the Japanese Navy and Japan's opposition to the overthrow led to a concern that Japan might use military force to restore Liliʻuokalani to her throne as a Japanese puppet. Anti-Japanese sentiment heightened.

After April 30, 1900, all children born in Hawaii were American citizens at birth. Most of the Japanese children had dual citizenship after their parents registered them. The Japanese settlers set up the first Japanese schools in the United States. By 1920, 98% of all Japanese children in Hawaii attended Japanese schools. Statistics for 1934 showed 183 schools taught a total of 41,192 students. Today, Japanese schools in Hawaii operate as supplementary education (usually on Friday nights or Saturday mornings) which is on top of the compulsory education required by the state.

Today, where Nikkei are about one-fifth of the whole population, Japanese is a major language, spoken and studied by many of the state's residents across ethnicities. It is taught in private Japanese-language schools as early as the second grade. As a courtesy to the large number of Japanese tourists (from Japan), Japanese subtexts are provided on place signs, public transportation, and civic facilities. The Hawaii media market has a few locally produced Japanese-language newspapers and magazines; however, these are on the verge of dying out, due to a lack of interest on the part of the local (Hawaii-born) Japanese population. Stores that cater to the tourist industry often have Japanese-speaking personnel. To show their allegiance to the U.S., many Nisei and Sansei intentionally avoided learning Japanese.

Notable people

 Sanji Abe
 Bumpei Akaji
 Bernard Akana
 Earl I. Anzai
 Alan Arakawa
 George Ariyoshi
 Jean Ariyoshi
 Karen Awana
 Tadao Beppu
 Keiko Bonk
 Tom Brower
 Clarissa Chun
 Destin Daniel Cretton
 Kawika Crowley
 Nelson Doi
 Robert Fukuda
 Beth Fukumoto
 Carol Fukunaga
 Katsu Goto
 Colleen Hanabusa
 Troy Hashimoto
 Yu Hayami
 Harvey Saburo Hayashi
 Juggie Heen
 Ryan Higa
 Mazie Hirono
 Linda Ichiyama
 Dan Ige (UFC Fighter)
 David Ige
 Les Ihara Jr.
 Carrie Ann Inaba
 Kaniela Ing
 Egan Inoue
 Enson Inoue
 Daniel Inouye
 Ken Ito (politician)
 Kim Coco Iwamoto
 Randy Iwase
 Jon Karamatsu
 Derek Kawakami
 Richard Kawakami
 Michelle Kidani
 Jean King
 Chinyei Kinjo
 Ann Kobayashi
 Bertrand Kobayashi
 Sanzaburo Kobayashi
 Russell S. Kokubun
 Sam Saturo Kong
 Roland Kotani
 Ron Kouchi
 Sanoe Lake
 Fred Kinzaburo Makino
 Barbara Marumoto
 Herbert Matayoshi
 Spark Matsunaga
 Patsy Mink
 John Mizuno
 Iga Mori
 Ishiko Mori
 Motokazu Mori
 Hermina Morita
 Tetsuo Najita
 Keo Nakama
 Mark Nakashima
 Clarence Nishihara
 Scott Nishimoto
 Steere Noda
 Takashi Ohno
 Richard Onishi
 Ellison Onizuka (NASA Astronaut)
 Blake Oshiro
 Marcus Oshiro
 Paul Osumi
 Evelyn Rawski
 Pat Saiki
 Scott Saiki
 Thomas Sakakihara
 Shunzo Sakamaki
 Norman Sakamoto
 James Shigeta
 Maile Shimabukuro
 Louis Smolka (UFC Fighter)
 Mark Takai
 Dwight Takamine
 Yoshito Takamine
 Gregg Takayama
 Roy Takumi
 Brian Taniguchi
 Larry Tanimoto
 Charmaine Tavares
 Chris Toshiro Todd
 James Tokioka
 Jill Tokuda
 Clift Tsuji
 Wilfred Tsukiyama
 Shan Tsutsui
 Shane Victorino
 Lynne Waihee
 Glenn Wakai
 Ryan Yamane
 Stephen K. Yamashiro
 Kyle Yamashita
 Nadao Yoshinaga
 Keone Young

See also

Byodo-In Temple (non-denominational)
Honpa Hongwanji Mission of Hawaii (Jodo Shinshu)
Daifukuji Soto Zen Mission (Zen Buddhism)
Hawaii Shingon Mission (Shingon Buddhism)
Japanese American internment
Nisei Japanese American
Issei Japanese American
Ryukyuans (including Okinawans)
Chinese immigration to Hawaii
Korean immigration to Hawaii
Filipinos in Hawaii
Asian immigration to Hawaii
Puerto Rican immigration to Hawaii
Okinawans in Hawaii

Notes

Further reading
 Adachi, Nobuhiro. Linguistic Americanization of Japanese-Americans in Hawaii (1996) online
 Auerbach, James A. "Japanese Immigration into Hawaii and the Hawaii Annexationists." Journal of International & Comparative Studies (1970), 3#2 pp 13-32
 
 
 

  Kanemura, Sandy. Kokoro : Cherished Japanese Traditions in Hawaii (2004) online

 Kawakami, Barbara F. Japanese immigrant clothing in Hawaii, 1885–1941 (University of Hawaii Press, 1995)
 Kimura, Yukiko. Issei: Japanese Immigrants in Hawaii (U of Hawaii Press, 1992).

 

 Liu, John M. "Race, ethnicity and the sugar plantation system: Asian labor in Hawaii, 1850–1900." in  Lucie Cheng and Edna Bonacich, eds. Labor immigration under capitalism: Asian workers in the United States before WWII (1984) pp: 186-201.
 Miyakawa, Tetsuo Scott. East across the Pacific: historical & sociological studies of Japanese immigration & assimilation (ABC-CLIO, 1972).
 Morgan, William. Pacific Gibraltar: U.S.-Japanese Rivalry over the Annexation of Hawai'i, 1885–1898 (Naval Institute Press, 2011).
 

  Moriyama, Alan Takeo. Mingaisha: Japanese emigration companies and Hawaii, 1894-1908 (U of Hawaii Press, 1985) online

 Nordyke, Eleanor C., and Y. Scott Matsumoto. "Japanese in Hawaii: a Historical and Demographic Perspective." Hawaiian Journal of History (1977), Vol. 11, p162-174.online

 Ogawa, Dennis M. ed. Kodomo no tame ni = For the sake of the children : the Japanese American experience in Hawaii (U of Hawaii Press, 1978) online, excerpts from essays by experts 
 Okihiro, Gary Y. Cane fires: the anti-Japanese movement in Hawaii, 1865-1945 (Temple University Press, 1991) online
 Onishi, Yuichiro. "Occupied Okinawa on the Edge: On Being Okinawan in Hawai'i and U.S. Colonialism toward Okinawa." American Quarterly (2012) 64#4 pp 741-765 online

  - Master's degree thesis
 
 

 Van Sant, John E. Pacific Pioneers: Japanese Journeys to America and Hawaii, 1850-80 (University of Illinois Press, 2000).

Japanese-American history
 
History of immigration to Hawaii